Zygmunt Konieczny (born 3 January 1937) is a Polish composer of theatre and film music.

Zygmunt Konieczny spent his childhood in the village of Szczyrzyc. He debuted in the 1950s in the cabaret Piwnica pod Baranami in Kraków. Since then Konieczny composed many pieces for film, theater performances and singers such as Ewa Demarczyk and Joanna Słowińska. He lives in Kraków.

He won the 2003 Georges Delerue Award for his score of the film Pornografia.

Famous songs
Grande Valse Brillante
Karuzela z madonnami
Wyzwolenie (1976)
Noc Listopadowa (1977)

References

External links
Homepage (in Polish)

1937 births
Living people
Polish composers
Polish film score composers
Male film score composers
Georges Delerue Award winners
Sung poetry of Poland
Place of birth missing (living people)